The Florence Courthouse is a large 21st-century complex on the Viale Guidoni in the Novoli quarter of Florence, Tuscany, Italy.

Situated near the entry of the A11 highway and the Florence Airport, it is Italy's second biggest tribunal building after that of Turin.

Bibliography 
 

Palaces in Florence
Florence